Rollinia helosioides is a species of plant in the Annonaceae family. It is found in Brazil and Ecuador.

References

helosioides
Flora of Brazil
Flora of Ecuador
Flora of the Amazon
Critically endangered flora of South America
Taxonomy articles created by Polbot
Taxobox binomials not recognized by IUCN